Microbacterium flavum is a Gram-positive and aerobic bacterium from the genus Microbacterium which has been isolated from the tunicate Didemnum moseley in Nagasaki, Japan.

References

External links
Type strain of Microbacterium flavum at BacDive -  the Bacterial Diversity Metadatabase	

Bacteria described in 2008
flavum